Maple Lake is a lake in central Polk County, Minnesota, United States,  due south of Mentor and approximately  west of Erskine. The lake's name is taken from the extensive sugar maple forest that surrounds it.  Even before American settlement of the region, the existence of these extensive hardwood forests in an otherwise treeless open prairie gave the lake a geographic identity.  Maple Lake is a natural lake and the westernmost significant lake in the Red River Valley of Northwestern Minnesota. It appears on 19th-century maps of the area, and developed as a summer home and resort community as early as 1910. As a result of drought conditions and low inflows during the 1930s, however, the lake nearly dried up. Beginning in 1940 a two-stage Works Progress Administration development project involving the diversion of water from nearby Badger Lake and the Poplar River raised the lake to its current artificially maintained water level. This rejuvenated the resort industry, and the lake remains a popular summer home, recreational watersports and fishing lake, drawing people from eastern North Dakota and northwestern Minnesota as well as other neighboring states.

References

Sources
Maple Lake Citizen Monitoring Project Report, 'Maple Lake Assessment Report—1991', available on-line at http://redlakewatershed.org/projects.html.
J. Hoveland, 'Whatever Happened to the Gar Wood?  Tales of  Life at Hoveland's Haven and the Restoration of Maple Lake' (priv.pub., July 2007).

See also
 Maple Bay, Minnesota

Lakes of Polk County, Minnesota
Reservoirs in Minnesota
Works Progress Administration in Minnesota